Las verdes praderas is a 1979 Spanish film written and directed by José Luis Garci, starring Alfredo Landa. The film is a reflection of the years of prosperity lived in Spain after the transition to democracy that followed the death of Francisco Franco.

Plot 
José Rebolledo has a good job at an advertising company and sincerely loves his wife, Elena. The couple has two children and they all seem the perfect family. Without financial problems they can afford some quirks and have acquired a chalet in the Sierra de Madrid where they spend weekends in the company of family and friends, playing sports and having barbecues. However, for José, within this apparent happiness lies a deep sense of frustration with the lifestyle he has chosen. José finds himself out of place in this bourgeois life and he decides  to break with it.

Cast 
Alfredo Landa - José Rebolledo
 María Casanova - Conchi
Carlos Larrañaga - Ricardo
Pedro Díez del Corral -	Alberto
Cecilia Roth - Matilde
Norma Aleandro - Fidela

DVD release
Las verdes praderas  is available in Region 2 DVD in Spanish only. It was released on DVD in 2009.

External links
 

Spanish comedy-drama films
1970s Spanish-language films
1979 films
Films with screenplays by José Luis Garci
Films set in the Community of Madrid
Films directed by José Luis Garci
1970s Spanish films